Demand shaping is the influencing of demand to match planned supply.  For example, in a manufacturing business, dynamic pricing can be used to manage demand.
Dell Inc., is one of the best examples of companies that practice Demand Shaping and dynamic pricing. From its currently available supplies, Dell posts special sales weeks that influences the demand.

Overview 
Demand shaping refers to the practice of influencing the demand for a product or service in order to meet the goals of a company or organization. This can be done through a variety of means, including pricing strategies, marketing campaigns, and product design. Demand shaping can be used to achieve a number of objectives, such as increasing sales, reducing excess inventory, and smoothing out fluctuations in demand. It can also be used to improve the overall customer experience and build brand loyalty. One common technique used in demand shaping is price discrimination, which involves charging different prices to different customers or groups of customers for the same product or service. This can be done based on a variety of factors, such as the customer's location, income level, or level of demand.

Other techniques used in demand shaping include bundling, which involves offering products or services together at a discounted price, and segmentation, which involves targeting specific groups of customers with customized marketing campaigns.

References

Pricing